

List of Finnish utopian communities

Uusi Jerusalem, Sierra Leone (1792-1792) religious, enlightenment 
Amurinmaan yhtiö, Strelok, Russia (1868-1872), socialist (50 inhabitants)
Chillagoa, Queensland, Australia (1900-1900), socialist (80 inhabitants)
Sointula, Malkosaari, British Columbia, Canada (1901-1905), socialist (1000 inhabitants)
Sammon takojat, British Columbia, Canada (1905-1912), socialist, theosophic (50 inhabitants)
Red Deer plan, Alberta, Canada (1899-1899), nationalist
Itabo, Cuba (1904-1908), nationalist, socialist (50 inhabitants)
Ponnistus, Cuba (1906-1909), socialist (50 inhabitants)
Redwood Valley, California, United States (1912-1932), socialist, co-operativist (120 inhabitants)
Georgian Osuusfarmi, Georgia, United States (1921-1966), socialist (150 inhabitants)
Paradiso plan, Riviera, France (1925-1927), vegetarianist
Penedo, Rio de Janeiro, Brazil (1929-1940), vegetarianist, religious (150 inhabitants)
Viljavakka, Dominican Republic (1930-1944), vegetarianist (140 inhabitants)
Colonia Finlandesa, Misiones, Argentina (1906-1940), nationalist (500 inhabitants)
Colonia Villa Alborado, Paraguay (1920-1940), vegetarianist (60 inhabitants)
Jad Hashmona, Israel (1971->), religious (100 inhabitants)
Emmaus Jokioinen, Finland (1977->), environmental movement (20 inhabitants)

See also 
 List of American Utopian communities
 Karelian fever

Footnotes

Further reading

External links
  Suomalaisten utopiayhteisöjen historiaa

Society of Finland

utopian communities